Christian Giovanni Castillo Martínez (born August 25, 1984 in San Salvador) is a Salvadoran footballer. He was banned for life in 2013, for match-fixing while playing for the El Salvador national football team. After being banned, he played for Zeravani SC in the Iraqi Premier League, a league unsanctioned by FIFA.

Club career

Telecom & early career
Castillo began his professional career in 2002 at the age of 18, when he signed with now defunct Segunda División club C.D. Telecom.

Chalatenango
After spending four years with the San Salvador side, Castillo then transferred to C.D. Chalatenango for the 2006 Apertura season.

He made his Primera División debut on August 20, 2006 in a league match against C.D. Águila. Castillo's speed, ball control and exciting dribbling skills quickly made him somewhat of a fan favourite, but his first season with his new club saw him play most games off the bench. The following season things got worse for Castillo when he suffered an injury that led to him only being able to play one game the entire tournament. After having to watch most of the entire season from the sidelines, Castillo returned for the following season. This time he was able to prove himself and was consistently part of the club's starting eleven. This season also saw him score his first Primera División goal; it came on September 30, 2007 in a league match against Nejapa F.C.

Alianza
Controversially, Castillo then transferred to Alianza F.C. for the 2008 Apertura season, after the then C.D. Chalatenango club president Lisandro Pohl left the club and took all the players that he had helped to sign with him. After much dispute, it was decided that Castillo and the other players that Pohl had signed were eligible to transfer and they all officially became Alianza F.C. players.

At Alianza F.C., Castillo continued to impress and most importantly improved his game to become one of the most, if not the most important players at the club. He scored his first goal with his new club on November 26, 2008 in a league match against C.D. Águila. After being released from D.C. United before the end of the 2010 season, Castillo returned to Alianza for the Apertura 2010.
On October 21, 2012 Castillo played his 100th game for Alianza in their 2-0 loss against Metapan .

León
On 15 June 2009, Castillo was one of the three Salvadoran footballers signed to Mexican club, Club León on a loan basis, the other two were Rodolfo Zelaya and Julio Enrique Martínez. On 3 December 2009, it was announced that 
Club León had permanently signed Castillo along with the other two Salvadorans with a three-year contract.

D.C. United
Castillo joined Major League Soccer side D.C. United on loan for the 2010 MLS season. On June 29, 2010, he was released by the club after a fall out over contract terms and left the club. He made a total of 10 league games with the club, and scored one goal in a U.S. Open Cup match against FC Dallas.

Suphanburi F.C.
In February 2013, Castillo decided to try a big leap. After bittersweet negotiations with Lisandro Pohl, Alianza F.C.owner, he rescinded his contract calling a clause that allowed him to transfer to Suphanburi F.C. of the Thai Premier League, and signed a contract for one year with option for one more year, leaving Alianza F.C. in amicable terms.

After nine games, he terminated his contract and returned to El Salvador to sign with Luis Angel Firpo.

Zeravani SC
In September 2014, thanks to the Iraqi Premier League not being recognised by FIFA, Castillo and his fellow banned Salvadoran teammate José Henríquez joined Zeravani SC.

International career
Castillo officially received his first cap on April 23, 2008 in a friendly match against China. He scored his first goal for the national team on August 14, 2008 in a friendly match against Trinidad and Tobago. His second goal came almost eight months later on March 28, 2009 when he scored in a World Cup qualification match against the USA. His third goal came six months later on September 5, once again, against USA with a header above U.S goalkeeper Tim Howard.

On September 20, 2013, Castillo was one of 14 Salvadoran players banned for life due to their involvement with match fixing.

International goals

References

External links
  
  
 

1984 births
Living people
Sportspeople from San Salvador
Association football midfielders
Salvadoran footballers
El Salvador international footballers
2009 UNCAF Nations Cup players
2009 CONCACAF Gold Cup players
2013 Copa Centroamericana players
C.D. Chalatenango footballers
Alianza F.C. footballers
Club León footballers
D.C. United players
Salvadoran expatriate footballers
Expatriate footballers in Mexico
Expatriate soccer players in the United States
Major League Soccer players
Sportspeople involved in betting scandals
Sportspeople banned for life
Expatriate footballers in Thailand
Salvadoran expatriate sportspeople in the United States
Expatriate footballers in Iraq
Salvadoran expatriate sportspeople in Iraq
Salvadoran expatriate sportspeople in Mexico
Salvadoran expatriate sportspeople in Thailand